Harold Freeman was a rugby player.

Harold Freeman may also refer to:

Harold Freeman of People v. Freeman

See also
Harry Freeman (disambiguation)
Harold Freedman, artist